H. flavescens may refer to:

 Haliclona flavescens, a marine demosponge
 Halisidota flavescens, a North American moth
 Haloa flavescens, a bubble snail
 Halone flavescens, an Indian moth
 Haminoea flavescens, a bubble snail
 Harpalus flavescens, a ground beetle
 Hedychium flavescens, a perennial ginger
 Helcystogramma flavescens, a Russian moth
 Heleophis flavescens, a water snake
 Heliothis flavescens, an African moth
 Hesperilla flavescens, an Australian butterfly
 Heteroclinus flavescens, a Pacific clinid
 Heteronygmia flavescens, a tussock moth
 Hibana flavescens, an anyphaenid sac spiders
 Homoranthus flavescens, a myrtle endemic to New South Wales
 Hoplopheromerus flavescens, a robber fly
 Hygrocybe flavescens, a waxy cap
 Hygrophorus flavescens, a waxy cap
 Hyllus flavescens, a jumping spider
 Hylorana flavescens, a true frog
 Hymenopappus flavescens, a North American plant
 Hypocnemis flavescens, a South American antbird
 Hypoestes flavescens, a flowering plant
 Hypomyces flavescens, a parasitic fungus